Ihor Vitiv (born April 1, 1984) is a Ukrainian footballer who played as a goalkeeper.

Playing career 
Vitiv began his career in 2001 with FC Skala Stryi in the Ukrainian Second League. After several years in the third tier he achieved promotion to the Ukrainian First League with Obolon Kiev in 2005. He primarily played with their reserve squad FC Obolon-2 Kyiv in the Druha Liga. After failing to make an appearance with Obolon he was transferred to FC Krymteplytsia Molodizhne. He later had stints with FC Arsenal-Kyivshchyna Bila Tserkva, and FC Desna Chernihiv before heading abroad to play in the Armenian Premier League with FC Banants in 2010.

After a season in Armenia he returned to play with Desna Chernihiv. The following season he went across the border to Poland to play with Resovia in the III liga. He returned to Ukraine in 2011 to play with FC Metalurh-2 Zaporizhzhia, FC Poltava, and won promotion to the Persha Liga in 2013 with FC Stal Kamianske. In 2015, he went overseas to play in the Canadian Soccer League with Toronto Atomic FC. In his debut season he was named the CSL Goalkeeper of the Year in the Second Division.

In 2018, he played indoor soccer with Ukraine AC in the Arena Premier League. He returned to the Canadian Soccer League for the 2019 season to play with FC Ukraine United.

References 

1984 births
Living people
Ukrainian footballers
FC Skala Stryi (1911) players
FC Obolon-2 Kyiv players
FC Krymteplytsia Molodizhne players
FC Arsenal-Kyivshchyna Bila Tserkva players
FC Desna Chernihiv players
FC Urartu players
FC Metalurh-2 Zaporizhzhia players
FC Poltava players
FC Karlivka players
FC Stal Kamianske players
Toronto Atomic FC players
FC Ukraine United players
Expatriate footballers in Poland
Canadian Soccer League (1998–present) players
Association football goalkeepers
Ukrainian First League players
Armenian Premier League players
Ukrainian Second League players